Pradeep Kumar Rai, professionally known as Byakul Maila, is a Nepalese poet who composed the lyrics of the current Nepalese national anthem Sayaun Thunga Phulka. 

His writing was selected to be the national anthem of the newly declared Federal Democratic Republic of Nepal on 30 November 2006 out of 1272 submissions. The new national anthem was meant to be representative of the new era in the history of Nepal, after the abolition of monarchy in 2006. Amber Gurung composed music for the song.

National anthem lyrics

References

National anthem writers
Living people
People from Okhaldhunga District
1973 births
Nepalese male poets
Rai people